Alonso de Benavides, OFM (c.1578-1635) was a Portuguese Franciscan missionary active in New Mexico, in the early part of the seventeenth century.

His use of the term Navaho is said to be the first printed reference.

Life

He was born on São Miguel Island, Azores, Portugal. He came to New Spain in 1598, and professed in the Franciscan convent of Mexico in 1603.

After acting as master of novices at the convent of Puebla, he became Custos of the Missions of New Mexico, 1626-9. He founded a mission in 1627 at what is now Santa Clara Pueblo, New Mexico. With the support of the King of Spain, and helped by Fray Esteban de Peréa, he secured a reinforcement of missionaries there.

He travelled to Spain in 1630 and there was in communication with María de Ágreda He acted as confessor to Francisco de Melo, 1633-5. Back in Spain in 1635, he was appointed auxiliary  Archbishop of Goa; he died on the eastward sea journey.

Works
In order to raise interest in New Mexico he wrote and published two booklets, exaggerated in regard to the number of Indians, but otherwise of value for the ethnography and ethnology of New Mexico. His account of the numbers of people and villages may have been influenced by data taken from Antonio de Espejo.

He published "Relación de los grandes Tesoros espirituales y temporales descubiertos con el auxilio de Dios en el Nuevo Mexico", in 1630, and is best known through the "Memorial que Fray Juan de Santander de la orden de San Francisco &c. presenta á la Majestad Católica del Rey" (Madrid, 1630 translated into various languages and republished).

Sources

Memorial (Madrid, 1630 );
Pinelo, Epitome (Madrid, 1738), II;
Beristain, Biblioteca, etc. Mexico, 1816), II;
Vetancourt, Teatro mexican (Mexico, 1698); especially Cronica de la Provincia del Santo Evangelio de Mexico; bandelier, Final Report, etc., I and II.

References

Attribution

External links
Handbook of Texas Online

1570s births
1635 deaths
Portuguese Friars Minor
Portuguese Roman Catholic missionaries
People from São Miguel Island
16th-century Portuguese people
17th-century Portuguese people
Franciscan missionaries
Roman Catholic missionaries in New Spain
Roman Catholic missionaries in the United States

es:Alonso de Benavides#top